The Walter Payton NFL Man of the Year award is presented annually by the National Football League (NFL) honoring a player's commitment to philanthropy and community impact, as well as his excellence on the field. Prior to 1999, it was called simply the NFL Man of the Year Award. Shortly after Chicago Bears running back Walter Payton died (having been the 1977 recipient himself), the award was renamed to honor his legacy as a humanitarian.

The NFL Man of the Year trophy was created in 1969 by artist Daniel Bennett Schwartz, depicting a nondescript caped lineman standing alone on the sidelines, outside of game action; it symbolizes that the award is intended to recognize any player, including one who may perform in a lower-profile playing position outside of the spotlight, whose humanitarian contributions and efforts are worthy. The trophy has never been intended to specifically resemble Payton.

Each year, a winner is selected from 32 nominees from the 32 different teams. A panel of judges, which includes the Commissioner of the NFL, the previous year's winner, and a number of former players select the winner of the award. The Man of the Year winner receives a $250,000 donation in his name to a charity of his choice. The other 31 finalists also receive donations in their name of $50,000 each to charities of their choice. The Kansas City Chiefs and Chicago Bears have had more winners of the award than any other teams, with five winners each. The Pittsburgh Steelers, Los Angeles Chargers, and Dallas Cowboys are the next highest teams with four winners each.

Since 2017, previous winners who are currently active in the league wear a patch depicting the trophy on their uniforms for the rest of their NFL careers. The current active winners (in chronological order) are Calais Campbell, Russell Wilson, and Dak Prescott. Once announced, the nominees of each team are given a helmet decal, also depicting the trophy, to wear for the remainder of the season. The winner is also acknowledged during the Super Bowl pre-game ceremony before "America the Beautiful" and "The Star-Spangled Banner".

The NFL describes the award as its "most prestigious accolade" and recipients of the award place it among their most cherished.

Winners

See also
Walter Camp Man of the Year
Walter Camp Distinguished American Award
Walter Camp Alumni of the Year
Amos Alonzo Stagg Award
National Football Foundation Distinguished American Award
National Football Foundation Gold Medal Winners
Theodore Roosevelt Award
NFLPA Alan Page Community Award
Athletes in Action/Bart Starr Award
Laureus Sport for Good Award
List of National Football League awards

References
General
 
Specific

National Football League trophies and awards
Walter Payton
Lists of sportsmen